Skrilje is a village in the Vipava Valley in the Municipality of Ajdovščina in the Littoral region of Slovenia. It is divided into three smaller hamlets: Valiči, Ruštji, and  Bajči.

The local church is dedicated to Saint Margaret of Antioch and belongs to the Parish of Kamnje.

References

External links 
Skrilje at Geopedia

Populated places in the Municipality of Ajdovščina